The One and Only Ivan is a 2012 novel written by Katherine Applegate and illustrated by Patricia Castelao.  It is about a silverback gorilla named Ivan who lived in a cage at a mall, and is written from Ivan's point of view. In 2013 it was named the winner of the Newbery Medal. It has won several other awards and is currently nominated to several reading lists. It was followed in 2020 by The One and Only Bob, presented from the point of view of Ivan's best friend, the dog Bob.

Plot

The story is placed at the Exit 8 Big Top Mall by the Video Arcade. Ivan, the Silverback Gorilla, has lived in captivity at the Big Top  Mall for 9,855 days by his own tally. He lives in his domain, and is generally content with his life. He watches television, eats bananas, and makes artwork that is sold by the owner. Along with Ivan, Stella, an elephant, and Bob, a stray dog, live at the mall. Stella is an older elephant who has a chronic injury in one leg and regularly performs in the daily shows. Unlike Ivan, Stella has a long memory and can remember living in other places, like the circus where she was taught many of her tricks. However, Stella wanted to live in a zoo, because they have much wider spaces for their domains. Stella believes that good zoos are how humans make amends. 

When Ruby, a baby elephant, is brought to the Big Top Mall to live with Stella and learn new tricks, things begin to change. Stella's old injury causes her to get sick. Just before Stella succumbs to her illness and passes away, she asks Ivan to take care of Ruby and find her a better place. Ivan promises he will take care of Ruby, even though he does not know how he will manage to do it. 

After Stella's death, Ivan begins to remember his life before the Big Top Mall and what it was like to have freedom if only to have stories to tell to Ruby. While Mack, the owner of the Big Top Mall is trying to train Ruby to do tricks, Ivan witnessed first-hand the abuse to which she is subjected and starts to decide how to keep his promise to Stella.

When Julia, the custodian George's daughter, gives Ivan some finger paints, he begins to get an idea of how to help Ruby. He also changes his opinion of the Big Top Mall. He no longer thinks of his area as his domain but as a cage. 

Ivan uses his art to make a large picture of a zoo. George and Julia help him by putting it on the billboard outside of the Big Top Mall. When people see the new signs, they begin to protest the treatment of the animals. Investigators are sent to the Big Top Mall and eventually, it is closed down. Ivan, Ruby, and the other animals are taken away to a zoo. Ivan and Ruby are both adopted by the same zoo, where they begin adapting to their new habitats and the other animals they now live with.

Characters
Ivan: An easygoing gorilla who has lived in the Big Top Mall and Video Arcade for 27 years. Ivan has spent most of his life in captivity, either living in a human home or at the Exit 8 Big Top Mall and Video Arcade. He remembers only a little about his life before captivity and has grown content with his life at the mall. As the story progresses, Ivan determines that his life is not satisfactory and he works to save Ruby and himself by having them both brought to a zoo, where they will spend the rest of their life.
Stella: a senior elephant who used to live in a traveling circus before she suffered an injury and was sold to Mack. Stella has a long memory, and would much prefer to live in a zoo. She extracts a promise from Ivan to take care of Ruby if she cannot. She also dies from her foot infection
Bob: a stray dog who lives with Ivan in his domain. Bob is satisfied to be a stray dog and has no desire to be adopted into a human home                                                                                                                                              
Mack: the owner of the small mall and part-time circus clown; he purchased Ivan from poachers who captured him in his home in Africa. Mack is not seen often in the book. He appears to be a generally good man. However, his business is failing and he cannot afford to keep up the mall the way he used to. His actions regarding Stella and Ruby are what finally spur Ivan to try to have Ruby moved to a zoo. 
George: The mall custodian. George is a good man who cares for the animals and the mall. However, he is conflicted about helping them because he is afraid of losing his job.
Julia: George's daughter, who inspires Ivan to love drawing. Julia works to help Ivan in his quest to move Ruby and the other animals to a zoo.
Ruby: a baby elephant who is new to the mall. Ruby has only recently lost her mother and has never previously been trained in circus tricks. Ruby's treatment at the hands of Mack is what ultimately drives Ivan to try to find a way to save her. She can also tell if people are lying.
Thelma: a repetitive parrot who lives in the mall.
Kinyani: a female gorilla who Ivan meets at the zoo.
Maya: the zoo owner who brings Ivan and Ruby and all the animals from the Big Top Mall to the zoo.
Murphy: a white rabbit whose job in the circus is to drive around in a little red fire truck and squirt people with a hose.

Inspiration 
Although The One and Only Ivan is an entirely fictional story, it is inspired by the true story of Ivan, who lived in a similar situation for 27 years. Eventually Ivan was adopted by Zoo Atlanta in 1994.

Reception 
The book had a positive response with a 4.25 review on Goodreads. According to Kirkus Reviews, "Fittingly, Ivan narrates his tale in short, image-rich sentences and acute, sometimes humorous observations that are all the more heartbreaking for their simple delivery... Utterly believable, this bittersweet story... will inspire a new generation of advocates." Jonathan Hunt wrote in The Horn Book Magazine, "The choice to tell this story in the first person and to personify the gorilla with an entire range of human thoughts, feelings, and emotions poses important questions to the reader, not only about what it means to be human but also about what it means to be a living creature, and what kind of kinship we all share." Carolyn Phelan wrote in Booklist that "The text, written in first person from Ivan's point of view, does a good job of vividly conveying his personality, emotions, and intelligence as well as creating a sense of otherness in his point of view." Writing for School Library Journal, Elizabeth Bird said, "There's nothing twee or precious about it. Just good crisp writing, complex characters, and a story that will make animal rights activists out of the most lethargic of readers. Applegate has penned a real doozy of a book that speaks to the best and worst in all of us."

Film adaptation

On April 9, 2014, it was announced that Disney may adapt the book with Allison Shearmur to produce. On May 6, 2016, it was announced that Mike Newell would direct the film, but on March 1, 2018 he was replaced by Thea Sharrock. The screenplay was written by Mike White. The cast for the film include Sam Rockwell as Ivan, Angelina Jolie as Stella, Bryan Cranston as Mack, Ariana Greenblatt as Julia, and Ramón Rodríguez as Mack's assistant, Brooklynn Prince as Ruby, Helen Mirren as Snickers, Danny DeVito as Bob, with Indira Varma and Eleanor Matsuura in undisclosed roles. Shearmur, who died on January 19, 2018, would still have a producing credit along with Jolie and Brigham Taylor. The movie entered production on the week of May 1, 2018. It was originally planned for a theatrical release on August 21, 2020; however, due to the theater closures impacted by the COVID-19 pandemic, it was changed into a Disney+ Original as a video on demand release.

References

External links
The One and Only Ivan at Goodreads
Obituary of Ivan on npr.org blog
 

2012 American novels
American novels adapted into films
Novels by K. A. Applegate
Newbery Medal–winning works
Children's novels about animals
Fictional gorillas
First-person narrative novels
HarperCollins books